Sant'Angelo in Vado is a comune (municipality), site of Ancient Tifernum Metaurense and former bishopric in the Province of Pesaro e Urbino in the central Italian Adriatic region Marche.

Geography 
Its territory is crossed by the Metauro river.

The municipality borders with Apecchio, Belforte all'Isauro, Carpegna, Mercatello sul Metauro, Peglio, Piandimeleto, Urbania and Urbino. It borders also on Monte Ruperto, a frazione and small enclave of Umbria in the Marche belonging to the municipality of Città di Castello, Province of Perugia.

There were two periods when there was a Roman Catholic Diocese of Sant'Angelo in Vado, although the Diocese has been suppressed since 1986.

Notable locals 
 Federico Zuccari (1540–1609), painter and architect
 Taddeo Zuccari (1529–66), painter
 Saint Frances Xavier Cabrini (1850-1917), patron saint of immigrants

Sports 
The town is represented by Vadese Calcio, an amateur football (soccer) club founded in 1952, mainly competing in Eccellenza, Promozione and Serie D. Its colors are yellow and red.

References

Sources and external links

 Official website 

Cities and towns in the Marche